Outer Island may refer to:
Outer Island, Bermuda
Outer islands of Mauritius
Outer Islands (Seychelles)
Outer Island (Connecticut), United States
Outer Island (Wisconsin), United States

See also
Outer Barrier Islands
Outer Brewster Island
Outer Hebrides
Outer Holm of Skaw
Outer Lee Island
Outer Sister Island
Utö (disambiguation)
Utøy
Utøya